Joseph James Finlay (13 April 1879 – 15 September 1961) was an Australian rules footballer who played with Melbourne in the Victorian Football League (VFL).

Notes

External links 

1879 births
1961 deaths
Australian rules footballers from Victoria (Australia)
Melbourne Football Club players
Collegians Football Club players